Ross Lamont Valory (born February 2, 1949) is an American musician who is best known as the original bass player for the rock band Journey from 1973 to 1985 and again from 1995 to 2020. Valory was inducted into the Rock and Roll Hall of Fame as a member of Journey in 2017.

Career
Ross Valory was born on February 2, 1949, in San Francisco, California. He grew up in Lafayette, California, and attended Acalanes High School. In high school, he played clarinet, bass clarinet and guitar. His mother introduced him to jazz, particularly Dave Brubeck. He played with Frumious Bandersnatch followed by Steve Miller Band appearing on Rock Love. He was joined by guitarist David Denny, drummer Jack King and bassist Bobby Winkelman, all of whom would become members of the Steve Miller Band. It was Jim Nixon, the manager of Frumious Bandersnatch, who would introduce Valory to Journey band members, along with Prairie Prince, later of The Tubes who originally sat in on drums. Valory later joined the Golden Gate Rhythm Section which was later renamed to Journey.

Valory has played on all of Journey's albums except 1986's Raised on Radio and 2022's Freedom. For Raised on Radio, he was replaced on bass in the studio by Bob Glaub on three songs, while the remaining songs were played by Randy Jackson, who also played on the subsequent tour. Though he returned to the band when they reformed in 1995, Valory was dismissed from Journey again in 2020, with Jackson replacing him once again on the album.

One of Valory's techniques is to string a four-string bass with the bottom four strings of a 5-string set. Thus, instead of the usual E-A-D-G arrangement, his bass is strung as B-E-A-D, which he calls Nashville Tuning. This adds the five string depth to the songs, while allowing the quick fingering of a four-string neck. Valory recorded Escape with an Ovation Magnum II, used a Peavey and a Steinberger for Frontiers, and a Fender Jazz up until the Departure album.

Valory also played for The V.U., The Storm, and the Steve Miller Band.

Discography

Steve Miller Band
Rock Love (1971)

Journey
Journey (1975)
Look into the Future (1976)
Next (1977)
Infinity (1978)
Evolution (1979)
Departure (1980)
Dream, After Dream (1980)
Captured (1981)
Escape (1981)
Frontiers (1983)
Trial by Fire (1996)
Arrival (2001)
Red 13 (2002)
Generations (2005)
Revelation (2008)
Eclipse (2011)

Todd Rundgren
2nd Wind (1991)

The Storm
The Storm (1991)
Eye of the Storm (1996)

The V.U.
Phoenix Rising (2000)

References

Bibliography

External links
 Ross Valory official MySpace site
 Official Journey website
 Ross Valory Mouthman site
 Bass Musician Magazine Interviews Ross Valory
 
 

1949 births
Living people
American rock bass guitarists
American male bass guitarists
Guitarists from San Francisco
Journey (band) members
Singers from San Francisco
Steve Miller Band members
Frumious Bandersnatch members
20th-century American guitarists
The Storm (American band) members